John Cope may refer to:
John Cope (died 1414), MP for Northamptonshire
John Cope (died 1558), MP for Northamptonshire
Sir John Cope, 5th Baronet (fl. 1699), MP for Banbury
 Sir John Cope, 6th Baronet (1673–1749), British banker and politician
Sir John Cope (British Army officer) (1690–1760), British general during the 1745 Jacobite Uprising
John Cope (geologist), Welsh geologist
Jack Cope (1913–1991), South African writer
John Cope, Baron Cope of Berkeley (born 1937), British politician
"Hey, Johnnie Cope, Are Ye Waking Yet?", Scottish folk song
B-side song by Talk Talk, allegedly named after a sound recordist
A pseudonym used by surgeon Hastings Gilford
A pseudonym used by Talk Talk's frontman Mark Hollis (musician)

See also
Jonathan Cope (disambiguation)
Cope (surname)